Field garlic is a common name for several plants in the garlic genus, Allium:

Allium oleraceum
Allium vineale, native to Europe, northwestern Africa, and the Middle East